Hasmathpet is a small town that comes under Old Bowenpally in Secunderabad in the Indian state of Telangana. It is predominantly a middle class area. The historic Hasmathpet cairns, a medieval historical site, is located there.

Transport

TSRTC runs many buses from Old Bowenpally that connects to various parts of the city such as Secunderabad Railway Station, Afzalgunj, Mehidipatnam, Nampally, Medchal.

The closest MMTS Station is Secunderabad Railway Station also Fateh Nagar MMTS Station.

Lakes
Hasmathpet has a lake called Bon Cheruvu, or the Hasmath Cheruvu, which is one of the famous lakes in Hyderabad and Secunderabad.  It is connected from Alwal Lake to Hasmathpet and occupies a large space in this area. People from different areas come for a festival known as Ganesh Chaturthi which involves immersing representations of their idols in this Lake.  Lake Ramanna Cheruvu is in the Bowenpally area.

Demographics
Hasmathpet is populated with a majority of Hindus and Muslims. The other religions are. Christianity, Sikhism, and Hindu Kathik (sonker).

References

 Neighbourhoods in Hyderabad, India